Trubatsa unicornis is a species of sea snail, a marine gastropod mollusk in the family Muricidae, the murex snails or rock snails.

Description

Distribution
This marine species occurs off New Caledonia.

References

 Houart, R. (1991). Mollusca Gastropoda: The Typhinae (Muricidae) from the New Caledonian region with description of five new species. in: Crosnier, A. et al. (Ed.) Résultats des Campagnes MUSORSTOM 7. Mémoires du Muséum national d'Histoire naturelle. Série A, Zoologie. 150: 223-235.
Houart, R, Buge, B. & Zuccon, D. (2021). A taxonomic update of the Typhinae (Gastropoda: Muricidae) with a review of New Caledonia species and the description of new species from New Caledonia, the South China Sea and Western Australia. Journal of Conchology. 44(2): 103–147.

unicornis
Gastropods described in 1991